Sidney Irving Smith (February 18, 1843 in Norway, Maine – May 6, 1926 in New Haven, Connecticut) was an American zoologist.

Private life
Sidney Smith was the son of Elliot Smith and Lavinia Barton. His brother in law was Addison Emery Verrill. Smith married Eugenia Pocahontas Barber in New Haven, Connecticut on June 29, 1882. The couple had no children, and Eugenia died on March 14, 1916. Smith suffered from hereditary glaucoma, rendering him partially sighted from 1906, and completely blind some years before his death. He died on May 6, 1926 of throat cancer.

Education and career 
In his youth, Sidney Irving Smith became expert on the fauna around his home town, and an expert at making collections, particularly of insects. He studied at the Sheffield Scientific School of Yale University, and received his Ph.B. in 1867. Yale University conferred upon him the honorary degree of M.A. in 1887. He stayed on at Yale, initially as an assistant, but from 1875 as the first professor of comparative anatomy, a post he retained until his retirement in 1906. Thereafter, Smith remained at Yale as professor emeritus.

Having begun as an entomologist (being State Entomologist of Maine and Connecticut for a number of years), Smith changed relatively early in his career to the study of crustaceans, probably because of his work with the United States Fish Commission. He participated in many field excursions, sometimes in collaboration with Verrill or with Louis Agassiz. Smith was the chief zoologist during the dredging of Lake Superior carried out by the United States Lake Survey in 1871, and the dredging in the region of St. George's Banks in 1872 carried out by the United States Coast Survey. In 1884, Smith was elected to the National Academy of Sciences.

Legacy
Smith produced more than 70 original papers. His collections are now housed in the Peabody Museum of Natural History at Yale and at the National Museum of Natural History.

Sidney Irving Smith was honoured in the specific epithets of a number of species. They include Lembos smithi Holmes, 1905, Metapenaeopsis smithi (Schmitt, 1924), Oxyurostylis smithi Calman, 1912, Pandarus smithi Rathbun, 1886 and Siphonoecetes smithianus Rathbun, 1908.

Taxa named by Sidney Irving Smith include:

Callinectes danae S. I. Smith, 1869
Cardisoma crassum S. I. Smith, 1870
Eumunida S. I. Smith, 1883
Eumunida picta S. I. Smith, 1883
Eunephrops S. I. Smith, 1885
Eunephrops bairdii S. I. Smith, 1885
Hepatella Smith in Verrill, 1869
Hyalella S. I. Smith, 1874
Macrobrachium ohione S. I. Smith, 1874
Neomysis americana (S. I. Smith, 1873)
Orchestia agilis S. I. Smith, 1874
Parapaguridae S. I. Smith, 1882
Polycheles sculptus S. I. Smith, 1880
Uca pugnax (S. I. Smith, 1870)
Xiphopenaeus hartii Smith, 1869
Acanthephyra brevirostris S. I. Smith, 1885
Admete nodosa Verrill & Smith, 1885
Ampithoe longimana S. I. Smith, 1873
Ampithoe valida S. I. Smith, 1873
Arctus americanus S. I. Smith, 1869
Argulus laticauda S. I. Smith, 1873
Argulus latus S. I. Smith, 1873
Argulus megalops S. I. Smith, 1873
Benthonectes filipes S. I. Smith, 1885
Benthonectes S. I. Smith, 1885
Beringius brychius (Verrill & Smith, 1885)
Byblis serrata S. I. Smith, 1873
Bythocaris gracilis S. I. Smith, 1885
Bythocaris nana S. I. Smith, 1885
Colletes perforator Smith, 1869
Cymadusa compta (S. I. Smith, 1873)
Dyspanopeus sayi (S. I. Smith, 1869)
Elasmopus laevis S. I. Smith, 1873
Elasmopus levis (S. I. Smith, 1873)
Ephyrina benedicti S. I. Smith, 1885
Ephyrina S. I. Smith, 1885
Eucratopsis Smith, 1869
Eurypanopeus depressus (S. I. Smith, 1869)
Evibacus Smith, 1869
Evibacus princeps Smith, 1869 
Gammarus annulatus S. I. Smith, 1873
Hadropenaeus modestus (S. I. Smith, 1885)
Haliporus modestus (S. I. Smith, 1885)
Haliporus robustus (S. I. Smith, 1885)
Heterogenys microphthalma (S. I. Smith, 1885)
Heteromysis formosa S. I. Smith, 1873
Heteromysis S. I. Smith, 1873
Hippolyte zostericola (S. I. Smith, 1873)
Hyalopecten undatus (A. E. Verrill & S. Smith, 1885)
Hymenopenaeus modestus S. I. Smith, 1885
Hymenopenaeus robustus S. I. Smith, 1885
Melita nitida S. I. Smith, 1873
Metapenaeopsis goodei (S. I. Smith, 1885)
Metapenaeus goodei (S. I. Smith, 1885)
Munidopsis crassa S. I. Smith, 1885
Munidopsis similis S. I. Smith, 1885
Mysis stenolepis S. I. Smith, 1873
Neopanope sayi (S. I. Smith, 1869)
Neopanope texana sayi (S. I. Smith, 1869)
Palaemon ensiculus Smith, 1869
Panopeus hartii S. I. Smith, 1869
Panopeus harttii S. I. Smith, 1869
Panopeus obesus S. I. Smith, 1869
Panopeus sayi S. I. Smith, 1869
Panulirus echinatus Smith, 1869
Parapenaeus goodei S. I. Smith, 1885
Parapenaeus megalops Smith, 1885
Parapenaeus S. I. Smith, 1885
Penaeopsis goodei (S. I. Smith, 1885)
Penaeopsis megalops (Smith, 1885)
Pleoticus robustus (S. I. Smith, 1885)
Pontonia margarita Smith, 1869
Rimapenaeus similis (S. I. Smith, 1885)
Scyllarus americanus (S. I. Smith, 1869)
Scyphacella arenicola S. I. Smith, 1873
Scyphacella S. I. Smith, 1873
Thyasira grandis Verrill & Smith, 1885
Thyasira plicata Verrill & Smith, 1885
Trachypenaeus similis (S. I. Smith, 1885)
Xiphopenaeus Smith, 1869

References
 

American carcinologists
American entomologists
American taxonomists
1843 births
1926 deaths
United States Fish Commission personnel
Members of the United States National Academy of Sciences
People from Norway, Maine
Scientists from New Haven, Connecticut
Yale School of Engineering & Applied Science alumni
19th-century American zoologists
20th-century American zoologists